The Madman's Return is Snap!'s second studio album and contains the international massive hit "Rhythm Is a Dancer", which reached No. 1 in France, Ireland, Italy, the Netherlands, Germany and the United Kingdom and peaked at No. 5 in the US and Canada. The album was certified platinum in Switzerland and gold in Germany, Austria and the United Kingdom but only reached No. 121 on the US Billboard 200.

The earliest LP pressings didn't contain "Rhythm Is a Dancer". The album produced four singles; "Colour of Love", "Rhythm Is a Dancer", "Exterminate!" and "Do You See The Light (Looking For)".

Critical reception
AllMusic highlighted songs like "Rhythm Is a Dancer", "Don't Be Shy", "Believe in It", "Colour of Love", and "Who Stole It?" as "standout" tracks of the album, adding that the latter has a sound that recalls one of the group's earlier hits, "The Power". American magazine Billboard complimented new singer Thea Austin, who "does an admirable job" especially on "See the Light", and remarked that "Who Stole It?" "could break big." Arion Berger from Entertainment Weekly also highlighted "Who Stole It?", with its "fuzzy, stop-start hook". He also felt that the band "proves its talent for complex, hard-hitting dance beats" on the "eerie, futuristic" "Ex-Terminator", and "a witty warning to female gold diggers" on "Money". Berger named "See the Light" the album’s "finest moment", describing it as "lilting" and "as lush as Soul II Soul’s best work, and even the sequences of mush-mouthed rapping can’t dull its gloss." A reviewer from Melody Maker named "Colour of Love" the "highlight" of the album.

Track listing
First edition
 All music by Benito Benites & John "Virgo" Garrett III. All lyrics as noted. (Information taken from the original nine-track disc.)
 "Madman's Return" – 4:35 (Durron Butler) 
 "Colour of Love" – 5:32 (Butler, Penny Ford, Thea Austin)
 "Believe in It" – 5:08 (Benites, Garrett III, Austin, Butler)
 "Who Stole It?" – 5:10 (Butler)
 "Don't Be Shy" – 4:38 (Butler, Benites, Garrett III)
 "Rhythm Is a Dancer" – 5:32 (Austin, Benites, Garrett III)
 "Money" – 5:12 (Butler)
 "See the Light" – 5:45 (Butler, Ford, Austin)
 "Exterminate!" – 5:24 (Benites, Garrett III)
 "Keep It Up" – 4:05
 "Homeboyz" – 6:37
 "Sample City" – 1:08
 On the original nine-track album, tracks 1 & 3–7 are published by Hanseatic/Songs Of Logic. Tracks 2 & 8 are published by Hanseatic/Songs of Logic/Zomba Music. Track 9 is published by Hanseatic.
 
Second edition
 "Madman's Return" – 4:35
 "Colour of Love" – 5:32
 "Believe in It" – 5:08
 "Who Stole It?" – 5:10
 "Don't Be Shy" – 4:38
 "Rhythm Is a Dancer" – 5:32
 "Money" – 5:12
 "See the Light" – 5:45
 "Rhythm Is a Dancer" (7" Edit) – 3:45
 "Ex-Terminator" – 5:24
 "Keep It Up" – 4:05
 "Homeboyz" – 6:37
 "Sample City V2.01" – 1:10

Third edition (marked as such on the front cover)
 "Madman's Return" – 4:35
 "Colour of Love" – 5:32
 "Believe in It" – 5:08
 "Who Stole It?" – 5:10
 "Don't Be Shy" – 4:38
 "Rhythm Is a Dancer" – 5:32
 "Money" – 5:12
 "See the Light" – 5:45
 "Rhythm Is a Dancer" (7" Edit) – 3:45
 "Exterminate" (Endzeit 7") – 4:20
 "Ex-Terminator" – 5:24
 "Keep It Up" – 4:05
 "Homeboyz" – 6:37
 "Sample City V2.01" – 1:10

Personnel
 Benito Benites, John "Virgo" Garrett III – keyboards, drum programming
 Penny Ford, Durron Butler (aka Turbo B), Thea Austin – vocals
 Andy Plöcher, Daniel Iribarren – guitars, bass
 Bobby Sattler – woodwinds

Charts

Weekly charts

Year-end charts

Certifications and sales

References

1992 albums
Snap! albums